Diffa is a city and Urban Commune in the extreme southeast of Niger, near the border with Nigeria. It is the administrative seat of both Diffa Region, and the smaller Diffa Department. , the commune had a total population of 48,005 people.

History
In 2002, it was the centre of the first military uprising in the country since President Tandja Mamadou instituted civilian rule and led to a crackdown by the government against the civilian press.

Nigerian refugees 
In recent years refugees from Nigeria fleeing violence from Boko Haram have settled in Diffa and surrounding area.

Geography

Diffa is situated on the north bank of the Komadougou Yobe river; the river's seasonal floodplain lies immediately to the south and east. Much of the riverbank is lined with gardens and small allotments which grow the town's well-known red peppers. The town is bisected in an arc by the Route Nationale 1 road; the eastern part of town is centred on the Grand Marché, which also acts as the transport hub for the city.

Climate
Diffa has a hot climate with a wet and dry season.

Architecture

Sports buildings

A traditional wrestling arena is located to the northeast of the Grand Marché. Diffa Stadium can be found west of the RN1.

Religious buildings
The town contains several mosques, most notably the Grande Mosquée de Diffa on the RN1.

Transport
Diffa marks the eastern end of the paved section of Route Nationale 1, the main east-west highway across Niger, although the section between Zinder and Diffa is only partially paved in places. RN1 continues north to N'guigmi more than 100 km. Maïné-Soroa, the other major town of the Region, lies less than 100 km to the west of Diffa. The border with Nigeria, at the Nigerian town of Duji, is 5.5 km to the south of Diffa. Diffa Airport lies to the north of the town.

Gallery

References

Communes of Niger